Bushkan (also Romanized as Būshkān and Booshakan; also known as Būshgān) is a city in Bushkan District of Dashtestan County, Bushehr province, Iran. At the 2006 census, its population was 2,337 in 513 households, when it was a village of the district. The following census in 2011 counted 2,279 people in 581 households. The latest census in 2016 showed a population of 2,135 people in 603 households, by which time Bushkan had risen to the status of a city.

References 

Cities in Bushehr Province
Populated places in Dashtestan County